"Jump Jim Crow" or  "Jim Crow" is a song and dance from 1828 that was done in blackface by white minstrel performer Thomas Dartmouth (T. D.) "Daddy" Rice.  The song is speculated to have been taken from Jim Crow (sometimes called Jim Cuff or Uncle Joe), a physically disabled enslaved African-American, who is variously claimed to have lived in St. Louis, Cincinnati, or Pittsburgh. The song became a 19th-century hit and Rice performed it all over the United States as "Daddy Pops Jim Crow".

"Jump Jim Crow" was a key initial step in a tradition of popular music in the United States that was based on the racist "imitation" of black people.  The first song sheet edition appeared in the early 1830s, published by E. Riley.  A couple of decades saw the mockery genre explode in popularity with the rise of the minstrel show.

However an alternative interpretation portrays Antebellum Jim Crow minstrel material as being highly progressive material which contains hidden political criticisms, but after the American Civil War, the songs were more regressive and racist.

"Abolitionists on both sides of the Atlantic seized upon this new format, including burnt-cork blackface, to promote the end of slavery."

The song which was originally printed contained "floating verses", which appear in altered forms in other popular folk songs.  The chorus of the song is closely related to the traditional Uncle Joe / Hop High Ladies; some folklorists consider "Jim Crow" and "Uncle Joe" to be a single, continuous family of songs.

As a result of Rice's fame, the term Jim Crow had become a pejorative term for African Americans by 1838, and from this time onward, the laws of racial segregation became known as Jim Crow laws.

Lyrics
As they are most commonly quoted, the lyrics of the song are as follows:

Standard English
Other verses, quoted in non-dialect standard English:

Variants
As he extended it from a single song into an entire minstrel revue, Rice routinely wrote additional verses for "Jump Jim Crow".  Published versions from the period run as long as 66 verses; one extant version of the song, as archived by American Memory, includes 150 verses. Verses range from the boastful doggerel of the original version to an endorsement of President Andrew Jackson (known as "Old Hickory"); his Whig opponent in the 1832 election was Henry Clay:

Other verses by Rice, also written in 1832, demonstrate anti-slavery sentiments and cross-racial solidarity, sentiments that were rarely expressed in later blackface minstrelsy:

The song also condemns Virginia for being the birthplace of George Washington, and the landing place for slaves from Guinea in Africa.

Origins 
The origin of the name "Jim Crow" is obscure but may have evolved from the use of the pejorative "crow" to refer to black people in the 1730s. Jim may be derived from "Jimmy", an old cant term for a crow, which is based on a pun for the tool "crow" (crowbar). Before 1900, crowbars were called "crows" and a short crowbar was and still is called a "jimmy" ("jemmy" in British English), a typical burglar's tool.  The folk concept of a dancing crow predates the Jump Jim Crow minstrelsy and has its origins in the old farmer's practice of soaking corn in whiskey and leaving it out for the crows. The crows eat the corn and become so drunk that they cannot fly, but wheel and jump helplessly near the ground, where the farmer can kill them with a club.

See also
 Uncle Tom

References

Further reading 
 Lyrics and background from the Bluegrass Messengers
 In Extraordinary Popular Delusions and the Madness of Crowds, Charles Mackay, pg 629–630, reported his dismay at hearing the song in London.
 Scandalize My Name: Black Imagery in American Popular Music, by Sam Dennison (1982, New York)
 

1828 songs
Blackface minstrel songs
American children's songs
American folk songs
Stereotypes of African Americans